This is a partial discography of the Croatian rock band Thompson and its eponymous lead singer Marko Perković "Thompson".

Studio albums

Live albums

Compilation albums

Other songs
Songs which Thompson has released separately, as well as collaborations.

Videography

Video releases

Music videos

Soundtracks

See also 
Music of Croatia

External links 
Thompson official site
Thompson discography

Discographies of Croatian artists
Rock music group discographies